Mount Merritt is located in the Lewis Range, Glacier National Park in the U.S. state of Montana. Located in the northeastern part of the park, Mount Merritt rises dramatically a vertical mile above nearby rivers. Near the summit, the Old Sun Glacier hangs along the east ridge. The summit is named for General Wesley Merritt in 1891 by members of Troop C, 1st Cavalry who were visiting the region while stationed at Fort Assiniboine.

See also
 Mountains and mountain ranges of Glacier National Park (U.S.)

References

Mountains of Glacier County, Montana
Mountains of Glacier National Park (U.S.)
Lewis Range
Mountains of Montana